HMS Dundalk was a Hunt-class minesweeper of the Aberdare sub-class built for the Royal Navy during World War I. She was not finished in time to participate in the First World War and sank after striking a mine in 1940.

Design and description
The Aberdare sub-class were enlarged versions of the original Hunt-class ships with a more powerful armament. The ships displaced  at normal load. The ships' complement consisted of 74 officers and ratings.

The ships had two vertical triple-expansion steam engines, each driving one shaft, using steam provided by two Yarrow boilers.

The Aberdare sub-class was armed with a quick-firing (QF)  gun forward of the bridge and a QF twelve-pounder (76.2 mm) anti-aircraft gun aft. Some ships were fitted with six- or three-pounder guns in lieu of the twelve-pounder.

Construction and career
HMS Dundalk was built by the Clyde Shipbuilding Company. In July 1937, Dundalk was recommissioned for the 3rd Minesweeping Flotilla in Malta. On arrival she was placed in Reserve and recommissioned in 1939, returning to England to work on the East Coast.

On 31 May 1940, Dundalk took part in the Dunkirk evacuation to Margate with 500 British troops. She sailed back to Dunkirk and on 1 June was attacked by 12 Messerschmitt aircraft. Dundalk then sailed back to Margate giving assistance to the Havant en route. She arrived at Margate at 12.15 on 1 June and disembarked 280 troops. She returned to Dunkirk, embarked about 450 French troops and arrived back at Folkestone on 3 June. The ship was mined on 16 October 1940 and foundered under tow the following day off Harwich at South Cutler Buoy.

Notes

References
 
 
 

 

Hunt-class minesweepers (1916)
Royal Navy ship names
World War II shipwrecks in the North Sea
Ships sunk by mines
1919 ships
Maritime incidents in October 1940